Bulgarian Footballer of the Year (Futbolist №1 na Balgariya) is an annual title awarded to the best Bulgarian association football player of the year. The award has been given since 1961, and the winner is elected by authorized journalists from the leading Bulgarian media.

History
2011 was the first year with a vote held online by fans. The poll has been organized by the Futbol newspaper (1961–1975), the Start newspaper (1975–1998), the Futbol newspaper and Start magazine (1999–present).

The footballers to have won the award the most times are Dimitar Berbatov (7 times - 2002, 2004, 2005, 2007, 2008, 2009, 2010), Hristo Stoichkov (5 times - 1989, 1990, 1991, 1992, 1994), Hristo Bonev (1969, 1972, 1973) and Ivelin Popov (2015, 2016, 2017). The clubs with the most winners are Levski Sofia and CSKA Sofia with 11 each.

List of Bulgarian Footballer of the Year

Men

Youth

Women

Statistics

Multiple winners

Winners by league

See also
 A PFG Player of the Season
 A PFG Young Player of the Season
 Bulgarian Sportsperson of the Year

References

Sources

External links

Footballers in Bulgaria
Association football player of the year awards by nationality
Footballer of the Year
Awards established in 1961
1961 establishments in Bulgaria
Annual events in Bulgaria
Association football player non-biographical articles